Cholamadevi is a village in the Udayarpalayam taluk of Ariyalur district, Tamil Nadu, India.

Demographics 

As per the 2001 census, Cholamadevi had a total population of 3458 with 1781 males and 1677 females.

References 

Villages in Ariyalur district